Presidente Franco may refer to:
 Manuel Franco, 26th President of Paraguay
 Rafael Franco, 32nd President of Paraguay
 Federico Franco, 49th President of Paraguay
 Presidente Franco District, district and city of the Alto Paraná Department, Paraguay